Steps in Time is the debut studio album by English new wave band King, released in November 1984 by CBS Records. The album peaked at No. 6 on the UK Albums Chart and was certified Gold by the BPI. 

The album included three singles. "Love & Pride", "Soul On My Boots" and "Won't You Hold My Hand Now" were all released in 1984 but were initially unsuccessful. "Love and Pride" was then re-released in January 1985, this time becoming a hit and peaking at No. 2 in the UK Singles Chart. "Won't You Hold My Hand Now", was re-released in March 1985 and peaked at No. 24. A live videoclip was also released for the track "Trouble", and aired on MTV, though the song was never released as a single.

The cassette edition of the album was soon re-released with eight bonus tracks, including B-sides, previously unreleased songs and remixes.

The first CD edition was not released until 1993 and featured no bonus tracks but did, perhaps unintentionally, include the single remix of Won't You Hold My Hand Now instead of the standard album version.

The album was reissued on CD in 1994 by American company Oglio Records with 8 bonus tracks. A second reissue was released in the UK in 2010 by Cherry Red Records with 7 bonus tracks.

Track listing

LP
Side one
"Fish" – 5:10 (P. King)
"Love & Pride" – 3:20 (P. King, M. Roberts)
"And As for Myself" – 3:22 (P. King, P. Haines)
"Trouble" – 4:02 (P. King)
"Won't You Hold My Hand Now" – 3:02 (P. King, M. Roberts, J. Lantsbery, T. Wall)

Side two
"Unity Song" – 4:06 (P. King)
"Cherry" – 4:15 (P. King, P. Haines, M. Roberts, J. Lantsbery, T. Wall)
"Soul On My Boots" – 3:35 (P. King)
"I Kissed the Spikey Fridge" – 4:05 (P. King)
"Fish (Reprise)" – 2:28 (P. King)

MC/CD
"Fish"
"Love & Pride"
"And As for Myself"
"Trouble"
"Won't You Hold My Hand Now"
"Don't Stop"
"Soul on My Boots (Rub-a-Dub Mix)"
"Endlessly"
"Fools"
"Unity Song"
"Cherry"
"Soul on My Boots"
"I Kissed the Spikey Fridge"
"Fish (Reprise)"
"Ain't No Doubt"
"Love & Pride (Body & Soul Mix)"
"Won't You Hold My Hand Now (Heavy Times Mix)"
"Classic Strangers"

Personnel
Credits are adapted from the Steps in Time liner notes.

King
Paul King – vocals
Mick Roberts – keyboards
Anthony "Tony" Wall – bass guitar
Jim "Jackal" Lantsbery – guitar

Additional musicians and production
Richard James Burgess – producer, drums
Phill Brown – engineer, mixing
Liam Henshall – producer (track 5)
Andy Jackson – engineer
Flood – engineer
Dave Bascombe – engineer  (track 5)
Aaron – recording
Perry Haines – management
Assorted iMaGes – sleeve design
Sheila Rock – photography
Clare Muller – photography
James Palmer – photography

Release history

References

External links

1984 debut albums
King (band) albums
Albums produced by Richard James Burgess
CBS Records albums